Ibuprofen is a nonsteroidal anti-inflammatory drug (NSAID) that is used to relieve pain, fever, and inflammation. This includes painful menstrual periods, migraines, and rheumatoid arthritis. It may also be used to close a patent ductus arteriosus in a premature baby. It can be used by mouth or intravenously. It typically begins working within an hour.

Common side effects include heartburn and a rash. Compared to other NSAIDs, it may have other side effects such as gastrointestinal bleeding. It increases the risk of heart failure, kidney failure, and liver failure. At low doses, it does not appear to increase the risk of heart attack; however, at higher doses it may. Ibuprofen can also worsen asthma. While its safety in early pregnancy is unclear, it appears to be harmful in later pregnancy, so is not recommended. Like other NSAIDs, it works by inhibiting the production of prostaglandins by decreasing the activity of the enzyme cyclooxygenase (COX). Ibuprofen is a weaker anti-inflammatory agent than other NSAIDs.

Ibuprofen was discovered in 1961 by Stewart Adams and John Nicholson while working at Boots UK Limited and initially marketed as Brufen. It is available under a number of trade names, including Nurofen, Advil, and Motrin. Ibuprofen was first marketed in 1969 in the United Kingdom and in 1974 in the United States. It is on the World Health Organization's List of Essential Medicines. It is available as a generic medication. In 2020, it was the 38th-most commonly prescribed medication in the United States, with more than 16million prescriptions.

Medical uses

Ibuprofen is used primarily to treat fever (including postvaccination fever), mild to moderate pain (including pain relief after surgery), painful menstruation, osteoarthritis, dental pain, headaches, and pain from kidney stones. About 60% of people respond to any NSAID; those who do not respond well to a particular one may respond to another.A Cochran medical review of 51 trials of NSAIDS for the treatment of lower back pain found that, "NSAIDs are effective for short-term symptomatic relief in patients with acute low back pain".

It is used for inflammatory diseases such as juvenile idiopathic arthritis and rheumatoid arthritis. It is also used for pericarditis and patent ductus arteriosus.

Ibuprofen lysine
In some countries, ibuprofen lysine (the lysine salt of ibuprofen, sometimes called "ibuprofen lysinate") is licensed for treatment of the same conditions as ibuprofen; the lysine salt is used because it is more water-soluble.

Ibuprofen lysine is sold for rapid pain relief; given in form of a lysine salt, absorption is much quicker (35 minutes compared to 90120 minutes). However, a clinical trial with 351 participants in 2020, funded by Sanofi, found no significant difference between ibuprofen and ibuprofen lysine concerning the eventual onset of action or analgesic efficacy.

Adverse effects

Adverse effects include nausea, dyspepsia, diarrhea, constipation, gastrointestinal ulceration/bleeding, headache, dizziness, rash, salt and fluid retention, and high blood pressure.

Infrequent adverse effects include esophageal ulceration, heart failure, high blood levels of potassium, kidney impairment, confusion, and bronchospasm. Ibuprofen can exacerbate asthma, sometimes fatally.

Allergic reactions, including anaphylaxis and anaphylactic shock, may occur. Ibuprofen may be quantified in blood, plasma, or serum to demonstrate the presence of the drug in a person having experienced an anaphylactic reaction, confirm a diagnosis of poisoning in people who are hospitalized, or assist in a medicolegal death investigation. A monograph relating ibuprofen plasma concentration, time since ingestion, and risk of developing renal toxicity in people who have overdosed has been published.

In October 2020, the US FDA required the drug label to be updated for all NSAID medications to describe the risk of kidney problems in unborn babies that result in low amniotic fluid.

Cardiovascular risk
Along with several other NSAIDs, chronic ibuprofen use has been found correlated with risk of progression to hypertension in women, though less than for acetaminophen, and myocardial infarction (heart attack), particularly among those chronically using higher doses. On 9 July 2015, the US FDA toughened warnings of increased heart attack and stroke risk associated with ibuprofen and related NSAIDs; the NSAID aspirin is not included in this warning. The European Medicines Agency (EMA) issued similar warnings in 2015.

Skin 
Along with other NSAIDs, ibuprofen has been associated with the onset of bullous pemphigoid or pemphigoid-like blistering. As with other NSAIDs, ibuprofen has been reported to be a photosensitising agent, but it is considered a weak photosensitising agent compared to other members of the 2-arylpropionic acid class. Like other NSAIDs, ibuprofen is an extremely rare cause of the autoimmune disease Stevens–Johnson syndrome (SJS). Ibuprofen is also an extremely rare cause of toxic epidermal necrolysis.

Interactions

Alcohol 
Drinking alcohol when taking ibuprofen may increase the risk of stomach bleeding.

Aspirin 
According to the FDA, "ibuprofen can interfere with the antiplatelet effect of low-dose aspirin, potentially rendering aspirin less effective when used for cardioprotection and stroke prevention". Allowing sufficient time between doses of ibuprofen and immediate-release (IR) aspirin can avoid this problem. The recommended elapsed time between a dose of ibuprofen and a dose of aspirin depends on which is taken first. It would be 30 minutes or more for ibuprofen taken after IR aspirin, and 8 hours or more for ibuprofen taken before IR aspirin. However, this timing cannot be recommended for enteric-coated aspirin. If ibuprofen is taken only occasionally without the recommended timing, though, the reduction of the cardioprotection and stroke prevention of a daily aspirin regimen is minimal.

Paracetamol 
Ibuprofen combined with paracetamol is considered generally safe in children for short-term usage.

Overdose
Ibuprofen overdose has become common since it was licensed for OTC use. Many overdose experiences are reported in the medical literature, although the frequency of life-threatening complications from ibuprofen overdose is low. Human responses in cases of overdose range from an absence of symptoms to a fatal outcome despite intensive-care treatment. Most symptoms are an excess of the pharmacological action of ibuprofen, and include abdominal pain, nausea, vomiting, drowsiness, dizziness, headache, ear ringing, and nystagmus. Rarely, more severe symptoms, such as gastrointestinal bleeding, seizures, metabolic acidosis, hyperkalemia, low blood pressure, slow heart rate, fast heart rate, atrial fibrillation, coma, liver dysfunction, acute kidney failure, cyanosis, respiratory depression, and cardiac arrest have been reported. The severity of symptoms varies with the ingested dose and the time elapsed; however, individual sensitivity also plays an important role. Generally, the symptoms observed with an overdose of ibuprofen are similar to the symptoms caused by overdoses of other NSAIDs.

Correlation between severity of symptoms and measured ibuprofen plasma levels is weak. Toxic effects are unlikely at doses below 100mg/kg, but can be severe above 400mg/kg (around 150 tablets of 200mg units for an average man); however, large doses do not indicate the clinical course is likely to be lethal. A precise lethal dose is difficult to determine, as it may vary with age, weight, and concomitant conditions of the individual person.

Treatment to address an ibuprofen overdose is based on how the symptoms present. In cases presenting early, decontamination of the stomach is recommended. This is achieved using activated charcoal; charcoal absorbs the drug before it can enter the bloodstream. Gastric lavage is now rarely used, but can be considered if the amount ingested is potentially life-threatening, and it can be performed within 60 minutes of ingestion. Purposeful vomiting is not recommended. Most ibuprofen ingestions produce only mild effects, and the management of overdose is straightforward. Standard measures to maintain normal urine output should be instituted and kidney function monitored. Since ibuprofen has acidic properties and is also excreted in the urine, forced alkaline diuresis is theoretically beneficial. However, because ibuprofen is highly protein-bound in the blood, the kidneys' excretion of unchanged drug is minimal. Forced alkaline diuresis is, therefore, of limited benefit.

Miscarriage
A Canadian study of pregnant women suggests that those taking any type or amount of NSAIDs (including ibuprofen, diclofenac, and naproxen) were 2.4 times more likely to miscarry than those not taking the medications. However, an Israeli study found no increased risk of miscarriage in the group of mothers using NSAIDs.

Pharmacology
NSAIDs such as ibuprofen work by inhibiting the cyclooxygenase (COX) enzymes, which convert arachidonic acid to prostaglandin H2 (PGH2). PGH2, in turn, is converted by other enzymes to several other prostaglandins (which are mediators of pain, inflammation, and fever) and to thromboxane A2 (which stimulates platelet aggregation, leading to the formation of blood clots).

Like aspirin and indomethacin, ibuprofen is a nonselective COX inhibitor, in that it inhibits two isoforms of cyclooxygenase, COX-1 and COX-2. The analgesic, antipyretic, and anti-inflammatory activity of NSAIDs appears to operate mainly through inhibition of COX-2, which decreases the synthesis of prostaglandins involved in mediating inflammation, pain, fever, and swelling. Antipyretic effects may be due to action on the hypothalamus, resulting in an increased peripheral blood flow, vasodilation, and subsequent heat dissipation. Inhibition of COX-1 instead would be responsible for unwanted effects on the gastrointestinal tract. However, the role of the individual COX isoforms in the analgesic, anti-inflammatory, and gastric damage effects of NSAIDs is uncertain, and different compounds cause different degrees of analgesia and gastric damage.

Ibuprofen is administered as a racemic mixture. The R-enantiomer undergoes extensive interconversion to the S-enantiomer in vivo. The S-enantiomer is believed to be the more pharmacologically active enantiomer. The R-enantiomer is converted through a series of three main enzymes. These enzymes include acyl-CoA-synthetase, which converts the R-enantiomer to (−)-R-ibuprofen I-CoA; 2-arylpropionyl-CoA epimerase, which converts (−)-R-ibuprofen I-CoA to (+)-S-ibuprofen I-CoA; and hydrolase, which converts (+)-S-ibuprofen I-CoA to the S-enantiomer. In addition to the conversion of ibuprofen to the S-enantiomer, the body can metabolize ibuprofen to several other compounds, including numerous hydroxyl, carboxyl and glucuronyl metabolites. Virtually all of these have no pharmacological effects.

Unlike most other NSAIDs, ibuprofen also acts as an inhibitor of Rho kinase and may be useful in recovery from spinal-cord injury.

Pharmacokinetics
After oral administration, peak serum concentration is reached after 12 hours, and up to 99% of the drug is bound to plasma proteins. The majority of ibuprofen is metabolized and eliminated within 24 hours in the urine; however, 1% of the unchanged drug is removed through biliary excretion.

Chemistry

Ibuprofen is practically insoluble in water, but very soluble in most organic solvents like ethanol (66.18g/100mL at 40°C for 90% EtOH), methanol, acetone and dichloromethane.

The original synthesis of ibuprofen by the Boots Group started with the compound 2-methylpropylbenzene. The synthesis took six steps. A modern, greener technique for the synthesis involves only three steps.

Stereochemistry
Ibuprofen, like other 2-arylpropionate derivatives such as ketoprofen, flurbiprofen and naproxen, contains a stereocenter in the α-position of the propionate moiety.

The product sold in pharmacies is a racemic mixture of the S and R-isomers. The S (dextrorotatory) isomer is the more biologically active; this isomer has been isolated and used medically (see dexibuprofen for details).

The isomerase enzyme, alpha-methylacyl-CoA racemase, converts (R)-ibuprofen into the (S)-enantiomer.

The (S)- ibuprofen, the eutomer, harbors the desired therapeutic activity. Interestingly, the inactive (R)-enantiomer, the distomer, undergoes a unidirectional chiral inversion to offer the active (S)-enantiomer. That is, when the ibuprofen is administered as a racemate the distomer is converted in vivo into the eutomer while the latter is unaffected.

History

Ibuprofen was derived from propionic acid by the research arm of Boots Group during the 1960s. The name is derived from the 3 functional groups: isobutyl (ibu) propionic acid (pro) phenyl (fen). Its discovery was the result of research during the 1950s and 1960s to find a safer alternative to aspirin. The molecule was discovered and synthesized by a team led by Stewart Adams, with a patent application filed in 1961. Adams initially tested the drug as treatment for his hangover. In 1985, Boots' worldwide patent for ibuprofen expired and generic products were launched.

The drug was launched as a treatment for rheumatoid arthritis in the United Kingdom in 1969, and in the United States in 1974. Later, in 1983 and 1984, it became the first NSAID (other than aspirin) to be available over the counter (OTC) in these two countries. Boots was awarded the Queen's Award for Technical Achievement in 1985 for the development of the drug. Dr. Adams was subsequently awarded an Order of the British Empire (OBE) in 1987.

In November 2013, work on ibuprofen was recognized by the erection of a Royal Society of Chemistry blue plaque at Boots' Beeston Factory site in Nottingham, which reads:

and another at BioCity Nottingham, the site of the original laboratory, which reads:

Society and culture

Availability

Ibuprofen was made available by prescription in the United Kingdom in 1969 and in the United States in 1974. Since then, it has become available over the counter around the world in pharmacies, supermarkets, and other stores, because it is well tolerated and because there is extensive experience of it in the population and in phase-IV trials (postapproval studies).

Ibuprofen is the International nonproprietary name (INN), British Approved Name (BAN), Australian Approved Name (AAN) and United States Adopted Name (USAN). In the United States, it has been sold under the brand-names Motrin and Advil since 1974 and 1984, respectively. Ibuprofen is commonly available in the United States up to the FDA's 1984 dose limit OTC, rarely used higher by prescription.

In 2009, the first injectable formulation of ibuprofen was approved in the United States, under the trade name Caldolor.

Route
Ibuprofen can be taken by mouth (as a tablet, a capsule, or a suspension) and intravenously.

Research
Ibuprofen is sometimes used for the treatment of acne because of its anti-inflammatory properties, and has been sold in Japan in topical form for adult acne. As with other NSAIDs, ibuprofen may be useful in the treatment of severe orthostatic hypotension (low blood pressure when standing up). NSAIDs are of unclear utility in the prevention and treatment of Alzheimer's disease.

Ibuprofen has been associated with a lower risk of Parkinson's disease and may delay or prevent it. Aspirin, other NSAIDs, and paracetamol (acetaminophen) had no effect on the risk for Parkinson's. In March 2011, researchers at Harvard Medical School announced in Neurology that ibuprofen had a neuroprotective effect against the risk of developing Parkinson's disease. People regularly consuming ibuprofen were reported to have a 38% lower risk of developing Parkinson's disease, but no such effect was found for other pain relievers, such as aspirin and paracetamol. Use of ibuprofen to lower the risk of Parkinson's disease in the general population would not be problem-free, given the possibility of adverse effects on the urinary and digestive systems.

Some dietary supplements might be dangerous to take along with ibuprofen and other NSAIDs, but  more research needs to be conducted to be certain. These supplements include those that can prevent platelet aggregation, including ginkgo, garlic, ginger, bilberry, dong quai, feverfew, ginseng, turmeric, meadowsweet (Filipendula ulmaria), and willow (Salix spp.); those that contain coumarin, including chamomile, horse chestnut, fenugreek and red clover; and those that increase the risk of bleeding, like tamarind.

References

External links 

 
 
 

Analgesics
British inventions
Dermatoxins
Haleon
Hepatotoxins
Nephrotoxins
Nonsteroidal anti-inflammatory drugs
Propionic acids
Racemic mixtures
World Health Organization essential medicines
Wikipedia medicine articles ready to translate